Hersey may refer to:

Places

United States
 Hersey, Maine, a town
 Hersey, Michigan, a village
 Hersey, Wisconsin, an unincorporated community
 Hersey Township (disambiguation)
 Hersey (MBTA station), below-grade commuter rail station in Needham, Massachusetts
 John Hersey High School, in Illinois

United Kingdom
 Alan Hersey Nature Reserve, on the Isle of Wight
 a possible Old Norse name for the Isle of Arran

Other uses
 Hersey (name)
 USS General M. L. Hersey (AP-148), transport ship for the U.S. Navy in World War II

See also
 Heresy
 Hershey (disambiguation)